The 1949–50 Drexel Dragons men's basketball team represented Drexel Institute of Technology during the 1949–50 men's basketball season. The Dragons, led by 1st year head coach Harold Kollar, played their home games at Curtis Hall Gym and were members of the Southern division of the Middle Atlantic Conferences (MAC).

Roster

Schedule

|-
!colspan=9 style="background:#F8B800; color:#002663;"| Regular season
|-

References

Drexel Dragons men's basketball seasons
Drexel
1949 in sports in Pennsylvania
1950 in sports in Pennsylvania